A list of films released in Japan in 1994 (see 1994 in film).

See also
 1994 in Japan
 1994 in Japanese television

External links
 Japanese films of 1994 at the Internet Movie Database

1994
Japanese
Films